The Doso–Turumsa languages are a pair of closely related languages spoken along the Soari River of New Guinea, namely Doso and Turumsa, that appear to be closest to the East Strickland languages.

Pronouns
The pronouns correspond very closely. They are:

{| 
! !!sg!!pl
|-
!1
|*aɾẽ||*aĩ
|-
!2
|*nã||*nu
|-
!3
|*õ||*ũ
|}

See also
Dibiyaso language

References

External links 
 Timothy Usher, New Guinea World, Soari River

 
Strickland–Soari languages
Languages of Western Province (Papua New Guinea)